The 2018 Gold Coast Suns season was the Gold Coast Suns' 8th season in the Australian Football League. They also fielded a reserves team in the NEAFL.

AFL

Senior personnel

After round 20 in the 2017 season, senior coach Rodney Eade was sacked. In October 2017 it was announced that former  premiership player and  assistant coach Stuart Dew had signed a three-year deal to become the new senior coach at Gold Coast.

List changes

At the end of the 2017 season, the Suns announced that they had delisted five players, including three rookie-listed players. On the last day of the trade period the Suns accepted the trade, also receiving pick 41 from the Dockers.

One of the biggest trades of the 2017 trade period was that of two-time Brownlow medallist Gary Ablett. He requested a trade again in 2017, and Gold Coast attempted to secure a player from Geelong's best 22 in exchange, but again nothing could be settled on. On the last day of the trade period the Suns accepted a deal where they would receive pick 19 (a selection Geelong got as compensation for losing Steven Motlop) and Geelong's second round pick in the 2018 draft while losing Ablett, pick 24 and their fourth round pick in the 2018 draft.

Retirements and deslistings

Trades

Squad

Ladder

References

Gold Coast Suns seasons
2018 Australian Football League season